Gwilym Ednyfed Hudson-Davies (4 December 1929 – 11 January 2018), known as Ednyfed Hudson Davies, was a Welsh politician and Member of Parliament (MP).

He was born in Llanelli, the son of Ebenezer Curig Davies and his wife Enid (née Hughes). They moved to Bangor when Ednyfed was a child. Although both sets of grandparents were Welsh speaking, differences in dialect sometimes made communication difficult.

Hudson Davies was educated at Dynevor Grammar School, Swansea, the University College, Wales in Swansea, and Balliol College, Oxford. He became a lecturer in government and a broadcaster. Davies was elected Labour Party MP for Conway in 1966, serving there until 1970.  He was later elected for Caerphilly, in 1979. In 1981, he was among the Labour MPs who defected to the new Social Democratic Party.

In 1983, in Caerphilly, it was the Liberal side of the SDP-Liberal Alliance which put up a candidate. Davies therefore did not stand in Caerphilly, but was adopted in Basingstoke, having moved to the New Forest after marrying Amanda Barker-Mill in 1972. He lost comprehensively as it was a strongly Conservative seat.  The Liberals also did not win in Caerphilly.

Hudson-Davies remained active in public life as chairman of a museum trust in the New Forest in the south of England.

His first marriage ended in divorce in 1994 and in 2016 he married Sue Owen. He had twin daughters from his first marriage and a stepdaughter from his second.

He died on 11 January 2018, aged 88.

References

Times Guide to the House of Commons 1983
 https://web.archive.org/web/20110713201725/http://www.leighrayment.com/commons/Ccommons1.htm

External links
 

1929 births
2018 deaths
Welsh Labour Party MPs
Social Democratic Party (UK) MPs for Welsh constituencies
UK MPs 1966–1970
UK MPs 1979–1983
Alumni of Swansea University
Alumni of Balliol College, Oxford
Welsh-speaking politicians
People from Llanelli